Croix-Fonsomme is a commune in the Aisne department in Hauts-de-France in northern France.

In March, 2011, it changed its name from Croix-Fonsommes to Croix-Fonsomme.

Population

See also
Communes of the Aisne department

References

Communes of Aisne
Aisne communes articles needing translation from French Wikipedia